Margarita de Falconí (born 22 December 1944) is an Ecuadorian sports shooter. She competed in the women's 10 metre air pistol event at the 1996 Summer Olympics.

References

External links
 

1944 births
Living people
Ecuadorian female sport shooters
Olympic shooters of Ecuador
Shooters at the 1996 Summer Olympics
Place of birth missing (living people)
21st-century Ecuadorian women